Docimodus is a small genus of cichlids native to east Africa where they are found in Lake Malawi and one species (D. johnstoni) also occurs in Lake Malombe and the upper Shire River.

The species of this genus have unusual feeding habits: they feed on scales, fins, or skin of other fishes.

Species
There are currently two recognized species in this genus:
 Docimodus evelynae Eccles & D. S. C. Lewis, 1976
 Docimodus johnstoni Boulenger, 1897

References

 
Haplochromini
 
Taxa named by George Albert Boulenger
Cichlid genera